Ector County Independent School District (ECISD) is a public school district based in Odessa, Texas, United States.

In addition to the majority of Odessa (the portions in Ector County), the district also serves the communities of West Odessa, Gardendale, and Goldsmith, as well as rural areas in Ector County.

In 2011, the school district was rated "academically acceptable" by the Texas Education Agency. This district is home to the AVID National Demonstration School, Odessa High School.

Schools

High schools (grades 9–12) 
Odessa High School
Permian High School
George H.W. Bush New Tech Odessa
OCTECHS Odessa Career and Technical Early College High School
Odessa Collegiate Academy at Odessa College

Alternative education schools (grades 9–12) 
Alternative Education Center 
Ector County Youth Center

Middle schools (grades 6–8) 
James Bonham Middle School
James Bowie Middle School
David Crockett Middle School
Gen. Matthew B. Ector Middle School
Adm. Chester W. Nimitz Middle School
Wilson-Young (Alfred Mac Wilson and Marvin Rex Young) Medal of Honor Middle School

Elementary schools (grades K–5) 
Annie Webb Blanton Elementary
Dr. Lee Buice Elementary
Gen. Edward Burleson Elementary
Pres. David Gouverneur Burnet Elementary
Dr. Lauro F. Cavazos Elementary
Lt. Richard Dowling Elementary
Edward K. Downing Elementary
Murry Fly Elementary
Goliad Elementary
Gonzales Elementary
John Ireland Elementary
Pres. Lyndon Baines Johnson Elementary
Barbara Jordan Elementary
W. D. Noel Elementary
Gov. Elisha M. Pease Elementary
Gov. L. Sul Ross Elementary
Gen. Sam Houston Elementary
San Jacinto Elementary
G.E. "Buddy" West Elementary

Elementary magnet schools (grades K–5) 
Stephen F. Austin Montessori Elementary Magnet
Edward L. Blackshear Elementary Magnet
Capt. Ewen Cameron Dual Language Elementary Magnet
John Coffee Hays Elementary Magnet
Gale Pond/Alamo Year Round Elementary Magnet
Benjamin Milam Elementary Magnet
John H. Reagan Elementary Magnet
2005 National Blue Ribbon School
Col. William Barret Travis Elementary Magnet
Lorenzo de Zavala Elementary Magnet

Early education centers (pre-kindergarten) 
Dr. George Washington Carver Early Education Center
Pres. Mirabeau B. Lamar Early Education Center

Defunct schools 
AIM High School
Edward L. Blackshear Junior/Senior High School (now Blackshear Elementary School)
Career Center (now George W. New Tech Odessa)
Ector High School (now Ector Middle School)
Col. James Walker Fannin Early Education Center (originally West Side Elementary)
Goldsmith Elementary
Hood Junior High School (now Wilson-Young Middle School)
Notrees Elementary
Thomas Jefferson Rusk Elementary
Teen Parent Center

References

External links 

Ector County Citizens For Kids Group

School districts in Ector County, Texas
Educational institutions in the United States with year of establishment missing
Odessa, Texas